Dil Se Di Dua... Saubhagyavati Bhava? is an Indian social drama television series. Produced by UTV Software Communications and Trishula Productions it aired on Life OK from 18 December 2011 to 18 January 2013. It starred Sriti Jha, Harshad Chopda and Karanvir Bohra.

Plot

Viraj Dobriyal is a wealthy and powerful business tycoon who falls in love with an educated, simple and middle class girl named Jahnvi Sharma and marries her. Gradually, she  discovers that he is over-possessive and abusive when she faces domestic abuse. Viraj, who had an abusive childhood, is irrationally dominating (he has been diagnosed with OCD) while being sweet, polite and nice in front of people. Viraj sees Jahnvi with Sanjay one day when Jahnvi went shopping to buy a gift for Viraj. Sanjay drops Jahnvi home. Meanwhile, Viraj sees Sanjay holding her hand. Janvi decorates the house with candles and flowers and makes a cake for Viraj. When Viraj comes home, angry at her for being with Sanjay, he beats her up and rapes her. She becomes pregnant with Viraj's baby. Viraj is not happy to see Jhanvi's grandmother at home. He tries to let her mother out of the house but at the same time jhanvi and Dadi come. Viraj's Plan got backfired to Dadi. Dadi arrives at Payal's doctor (Komolika Rana) and she knows everything about Viraj and his bad bad behavior. later, Viraj organised a marriage for Sia  in a hotel. Manager of the hotel take Dadi to Viraj. Viraj tries to beat Jhanvi  but she lost her Child "Krishna " and she imagines as he is in the cradle. She does not face problems and she suffers from miscarriage because of Viraj's abuse.

Viraj discovers that Sanjay has been released from jail. Sanjay tries to tell Jahnvi about Viraj but she refuses to believe him. Viraj sees the two of them on the CCTV of his house. So, a tense Viraj takes Jahnvi to a room and shows his family picture to her who had died in his childhood. He reveals everything about his past and asks her not to ever leave him. Out of frustration, he tries to hit Jhanvi, but she does not react due to her promise.

Unable to bear Viraj's torture, Jahnvi attempts to kill herself. Later, Geeta encourages Jahnvi to live and face her problems. Dr Komolika suspects Viraj for Dadi's illness and Sanjay's arrest. Viraj mistreats his mother. He then forcibly takes Jahnvi in his car and drops her at her parents' house. Jahnvi breaks down, on seeing her family members' dead bodies and her burned house. Jahnvi laments on seeing the dead bodies of her family members. Viraj tells that he doesn't care and continues to torture her. He burns Jahnvi's house. She loses her all senses and collapses. Desperate to escape, Jahnvi fakes her own death, changes her identity to Sia and flees to Gurgaon. Sia meets Raghav in Gurgaon who falls in love with her. She becomes a governess to his nephew, Krish, and comes to be loved by his family.

Viraj tracks her down and creates misunderstandings with Raghav's family. Sia finally stands up to him and realising her love for Raghav, divorces Viraj who is sent to a mental asylum.

One year later
Raghav's brother Dev and his wife Komal are killed. Raghav learns that the killer is their family friend ACP Saxena who moonlights as a criminal named Rana. When Viraj discovered Rana's truth, Rana used electroshock therapy to reduce Viraj's mental ability to that of a seven-year-old child. Raghav manages to get Rana arrested and saves Viraj from near death. He helps Viraj regain his memory after which Viraj tries to win Sia back but Raghav decides to return him to prison.

On their way, they are attacked by goons who kill Raghav. Raghav dies with Sia's name on his lips and Viraj is blamed for the murder. He tries to convince Sia but also wants her back in his life. He poisons her and tells her that he will administer the antidote only when she tells him she loves him. Sia refuses and dies telling Viraj that she only loved Raghav and that her heart will live on to ensure Viraj has to pay for his misdeeds.

After Sia's death
Sia's heart is donated to a TV journalist named Ananya. Aware of Sia and Viraj's story, Ananya digs deeper and discovers Viraj killed Sia. She tries to expose him but fails. Viraj finds out about the operation and is angered that anything was stolen from Sia and tries to get her heart back.

Ananya discovers Viraj has been hiding Sia's dead body and finds it and takes it to be cremated. Viraj tries to stop her but she curses him and he suddenly realises how wrong he has been. Emotionally destroyed, he surrenders himself to the police and is sentenced to 14 years in prison. The story ends with Ananya's heart finally forgiving Viraj who is shown to be repenting his actions and living in prison with Sia's memories.

Cast

Main
 Sriti Jha as Jhanvi Dobriyal / Sia Singh: Viraj's former wife, Raghav's wife 
 Harshad Chopda as Raghavendra "Raghav" Pratap Singh: Sia's husband
 Karanvir Bohra as Viraj Dobriyal, Jhanvi's ex-husband; Raghav's enemy; Geeta's son.

Recurring  
 Mala Salariya as Ananya Ghosh, a journalist who receives Jahnvi's heart
 Vinay Rohrra as Rajender "Raj" Khanna, Ananya's friend
 Mouli Dutta as Paromita Ghosh
 Jaya Ojha as Uma Sharma 
 Akanksha Juneja as Tanisha 
 Sudha Chandran as Ms. Vyas
 Neha Mehta as Dr. Komal Singh, Raghav's brother's wife 
 Yash Ghanekar as Krish Singh, Dev and Komal's son and Raghav's nephew
 Kiran Bhargava as Sudha, Jahnvi's grandmother
 Sumukhi Pendsey as Gayatri Singh 
 Sulagna Chatterjee as Sia Sharma 
 Natasha Rana as Geeta, Viraj's mother
 Ram Mehar Jangra as Unniyal, Viraj's employee
 Zubin Dutt as Sanjay Sinha
 Urvashi Dholakia as Dr. Komolika Rana who helps Jahnvi get her new identity
 Fenil Umrigar as Priya Malhotra who wants to marry Viraj
 Vaquar Shaikh as Shekhawat
 Sagar Naik as Dr. Bhandari

Reception 
The show focussed on struggle of a woman to save herself from her obsessive, abusive husband. The Times of India stated that Bohra's and Sriti's performance brought higher TRPs to the show.

References

External links

Violence against women in India
Hindi serials focus on violence against women
Indian drama television series
Indian television soap operas
2011 Indian television series debuts
2013 Indian television series endings
Life OK original programming
UTV Television